Charles Clark may refer to:

Arts and entertainment
 Charles Clark (publisher, born 1806) (1806–1860), English farmer, poet and satirist
 Charles Heber Clark (1841–1915), American humorist
 Charles W. Clark (1865–1925), American baritone
 Charles Badger Clark (1883–1957), American poet
 Charles Clark (musician) (1945–1969), American jazz bassist
 Charles Dow Clark, actor and American football coach and referee

Military
 Charles A. Clark (1841–1913), American soldier and Medal of Honor recipient
 Charles Edgar Clark (1843–1922), U.S. Navy officer
 Charles Clark (admiral) (1902–1965), Australian admiral

Politics and law
 Charles Clark (governor) (1811–1877), Governor of Mississippi during the American Civil War
 Charles H. Clark (1818–1873), mayor of Rochester, New York
 Charles Nelson Clark (1827–1902), U.S. Representative from Missouri
 Charles Clark (Australian politician) (1832–1896), Member of the Legislative Assembly of Queensland
 Charles B. Clark (1844–1891), U.S. Representative from Wisconsin
 Charles Dickens Clark (1847–1908), U.S. federal judge 
 Charles Edward Clark (1889–1963), U.S. Court of Appeals judge; Dean of Yale Law School
 Charles Clark (judge) (1925–2011), U.S. Court of Appeals judge
 Joe Clark (Charles Joseph Clark) (born 1939), 16th Prime Minister of Canada

Sports
 Charles Clark (rugby union) (1857–1943), English rugby union player
 Charles Clark (Canterbury cricketer) (1866–1950), New Zealand cricketer
 Charles Clark (Auckland cricketer) (1883–1970), New Zealand cricketer
 Sensation Clark (Charles Douglas Clark, 1902–1964), American baseball player
 Boobie Clark (Charles L. Clark, 1950–1988), American football player
 Charles Clark (athlete) (born 1987), American sprinter

Others
 Charles Clark (lecturer) (1838–1903), English Baptist minister and lecturer
 Charles W. Clark (businessman) (1871–1933), American businessman
 Charles Upson Clark (1875–1960), American historian
 Charles Walter Clark (1885–1972), English architect to London's Metropolitan Railway
 Charles Clark (publisher, born 1933) (1933–2006), British publisher and expert on copyright

See also
 Charles Clarke (disambiguation)
 Charlie Clark (disambiguation)